Óscar Ramón Figuera González (born 6 October 1954) is a Venezuelan politician and General Secretary of the 

Communist Party of Venezuela.

References 

Living people
1954 births
Communist Party of Venezuela politicians
Members of the Latin American Parliament

Venezuelan trade unionists
20th-century Venezuelan politicians
21st-century Venezuelan politicians
Members of the National Assembly (Venezuela)
Venezuelan atheists
Venezuelan communists